Sir Louis Cools-Lartigue, O.B.E. (18 January 1905 – 21 August 1993) was a Dominican politician.

Biography 
Until 1955, Cools-Lartigue was the Chief Secretary of the Windward Islands, when on 9 May he was issued a Commission by George F. Holsten appointing him to the position of Governor's Deputy.

From November 1967 to 3 November 1978, Cools-Lartigue was the last Governor of Dominica. He was then elected Interim President and served as such from 3 November 1978 to 19 January 1979, until Fred Degazon was elected President of Dominica. During a constitutional crisis stirred by the desire for democratic socialist reforms, Degazon fled to England on 10 June 1979 and Cools-Lartigue was elected by the House of Assembly as his replacement on 15 June 1979. Cools-Lartigue resigned as President either the following day under family pressure, or due to rioters attacking his house on 17 June 1979. He was replaced as President of Dominica by Jenner Armour.

References

1905 births
Officers of the Order of the British Empire
Governors of Dominica
Presidents of Dominica
1993 deaths